Wellington High School may refer to one of several high schools:

Wellington High School, New Zealand

In the United States:

Wellington High School (Kansas), Wellington, Kansas
Wellington High School (Wellington, Florida)
Wellington High School (Wellington, Ohio)
Wellington High School (Texas)
Wellington C. Mepham High School